The 1921 New York Giants season was the franchise's 39th season, which culminated in the Giants defeating the New York Yankees in the World Series.

Regular season

Season standings

Record vs. opponents

Roster

Player stats

Batting

Starters by position
Note: Pos = Position; G = Games played; AB = At bats; H = Hits; Avg. = Batting average; HR = Home runs; RBI = Runs batted in

Other batters
Note: G = Games played; AB = At bats; H = Hits; Avg. = Batting average; HR = Home runs; RBI = Runs batted in

Pitching

Starting pitchers
Note: G = Games pitched; IP = Innings pitched; W = Wins; L = Losses; ERA = Earned run average; SO = Strikeouts

Other pitchers
Note: G = Games pitched; IP = Innings pitched; W = Wins; L = Losses; ERA = Earned run average; SO = Strikeouts

Relief pitchers
Note: G = Games pitched; W = Wins; L = Losses; SV = Saves; ERA = Earned run average; SO = Strikeouts

World series

Game 1
October 5, 1921, at the Polo Grounds (IV) in New York City

Game 2
October 6, 1921, at the Polo Grounds (IV) in New York City

Game 3
October 7, 1921, at the Polo Grounds (IV) in New York City

Game 4
October 9, 1921, at the Polo Grounds (IV) in New York City

Game 5
October 10, 1921, at the Polo Grounds (IV) in New York City

Game 6
October 11, 1921, at the Polo Grounds (IV) in New York City

Game 7
October 12, 1921, at the Polo Grounds (IV) in New York City

Game 8
October 13, 1921, at the Polo Grounds (IV) in New York City

References
 1921 New York Giants team page at Baseball Reference
 1921 New York Giants team page at Baseball Almanac

New York Giants (NL)
San Francisco Giants seasons
New York Giants season
National League champion seasons
World Series champion seasons
New York G
1920s in Manhattan
Washington Heights, Manhattan